Sangeeta may refer to:

Song and music
 Sangita or Sangeeta: music-related performance arts in the ancient and medieval era Indian texts.

Sangeet

Sangeeta
Sangeeta Bijlani (born 1965), Miss India in 1980
Sangeeta Krishnasamy (born 1985), Malaysian actress and model
Sangeeta Kumari Singh Deo (born 1961), member of the Lok Sabha of India
Sangeeta N. Bhatia (born 1968), Indian American biological engineer and professor at MIT
Sangeeta Niranjan, Indo-Fijian businesswoman
Sangeeta (Pakistani actress) (born 1947)
Sangeeta Richard, domestic helper whose employment contract led to the Devyani Khobragade incident
Sangeeta Shankar (born 1965), Indian violinist
Sangeeta (Telugu actress)

Sangeetha
Sangeetha Krish (born 1978), Tamil actress
Sangeetha Choodamani, an award given to Carnatic musicians in India
Sangeetha Kalanidhi, a title awarded yearly to an expert carnatic musician by the Madras Music Academ
Sangeetha Kalasarathy, a yearly title awarded to an expert carnatic musician by Parthasarathy Swami Sabha
Sangeetha Kalasikhamani, a title awarded yearly to an expert carnatic musician by the Indian Fine Arts Society
Sangeetha Katti (born 1970), Hindustani classical vocalist in India
Sangeetha Mahayuddham, an Indian reality-TV singing competition
Sangeetha Rajeshwaran, playback singer in the Tamil film industry
Sangeetha Sagara Ganayogi Panchakshara Gavai, a 1995 Indian Kannada biographical film
Sangeetha Weeraratne (born 1973), actress in the Sri Lankan cinema

Sangita
Sangita Dabir (born 1971), former cricketer
Sangita Ghosh (born 1976), Bollywood actress and model
Sangita Jindal (born 1962), chairman of the JSW Foundation
Sangita Madhavan Nair (born 1976), Malayalam actress
Sangita Makarandha, an ancient work on classical music written by Narada
Sangita Myska, British television journalist with the BBC
Sangita Patel (born 1979), Canadian television personality
Sangita Ratnakara, thirteenth-century musicological text from India
Sangita Santosham, Indian multilingual vocalist
Sangita Tripathi (born 1968), French fencer

See also
 Sangeet (disambiguation)